Following independence in 1960, Mali initially followed a socialist path and was aligned ideologically with the communist bloc. Mali's foreign policy orientation became increasingly pragmatic and pro-Western over time. Since the institution of a democratic form of government in 1992, Mali's relations with the West in general and the United States in particular have improved significantly. U.S.-Malian relations are described by the U.S. Department of State as "excellent and expanding," especially given Mali's recent record of democratic stability in the volatile area of West Africa and its avowed support of the war on terrorism. Mali is reported to be one of the largest recipients of U.S. aid in Africa.

Mali is active in regional organizations such as the African Union. Working to control and resolve regional conflicts, such as in Ivory Coast, Liberia, and Sierra Leone, is one of Mali's major foreign policy goals. Mali feels threatened by the potential for the spillover of conflicts in neighboring states, and relations with those neighbors are often uneasy. General insecurity along borders in the north, including cross-border banditry and terrorism, remain troubling issues in regional regions.

Although Azawad, a region spanning the expansive north of Mali, was proclaimed independent in April 2012 by Tuareg rebels, Mali has not recognised the de facto state. Britain has closed its embassy; ECOWAS has declared an embargo against Mali, aiming to squeeze out Malinese oil supplies; closed Mali's assets in the ECOWAS regional bank and has prepared a potential intervention force of 3,000 troops. France has declared it will assist in a potential intervention.

Multilateral membership 

Mali is a member of the United Nations (and many of its specialized agencies), the International Monetary Fund (IMF), the World Bank, the International Labour Organization (ILO), the International Telecommunication Union (ITU), the Universal Postal Union (UPU) and the International Criminal Court (ICC). It also belongs to the Organisation of African Unity (OAU); Organisation of Islamic Cooperation (OIC); Non-Aligned Movement (NAM); an associate member of the European Community (EC); and African Development Bank (ADB).

Mali is active in regional organizations. It participates in the Economic Community of West African States (ECOWAS) and the West African Economic Monetary Union (UEMOA) for regional economic integration; Liptako-Gourma Authority, which seeks to develop the contiguous areas of Mali, Niger, and Burkina Faso; the Niger River Commission; the Permanent Interstate Committee for drought control in the Sahel (CILSS); and the Senegal River Valley Development Organization (OMVS).

Bilateral relations

See also
 List of diplomatic missions in Mali
 List of diplomatic missions of Mali

References